Andrew Hatcher (1923–1990) was an associate press secretary to President John F. Kennedy and a founder of 100 Black Men of America in 1963.

Born in Princeton, New Jersey, Hatcher graduated from Witherspoon School for Colored Children in 1937 and Princeton High School in 1941. He attended Springfield College in Springfield, Massachusetts and served in the United States Army as a lieutenant during World War II. After his separation from the service, he relocated to San Francisco, California, working as a journalist and later as Assistant Secretary of Labor under Governor of California Pat Brown.  Hatcher served under Adlai Stevenson as a speechwriter during Stevenson's two unsuccessful runs for President of the United States in 1952 and 1956. In 1960 with his close friend Pierre Salinger he joined Sen. John F. Kennedy’s campaign press staff as a speechwriter. Immediately after his election as President, Kennedy named both men to his White House staff, making Hatcher the first black person to serve in the White House Press Office.  His young son Avery was a student in the home school which Jacqueline Kennedy established for her daughter Caroline Kennedy and children of White House staffers.

Hatcher died in 1990.

References

External links

 John F. Kennedy Presidential Library and Museum

1923 births
1990 deaths
White House Press Secretaries
Kennedy administration personnel
American civil rights activists
People from Princeton, New Jersey
Activists from New Jersey
United States Army personnel of World War II
Springfield College (Massachusetts) alumni
United States Army officers